Capricorn Rising is an album by American jazz pianist Don Pullen featuring saxophonist Sam Rivers recorded in 1975 for the Italian Black Saint label.

Reception
The Allmusic review awarded the album 4½ stars.

Track listing
All compositions by Don Pullen except as indicated
 "Break Out" (Sam Rivers) - 12:35 
 "Capricorn Rising" - 11:48 
 "Joycie Girl" - 6:36 
 "Fall Out" (Rivers) - 15:04
Recorded at Generation Sound Studio in New York City on October 16 & 17, 1975

Personnel
Don Pullen - piano
Sam Rivers - tenor saxophone, soprano saxophone, flute
Alex Blake - bass
Bobby Battle - drums, tambourine

References

Black Saint/Soul Note albums
Don Pullen albums
1975 albums